Eutelothyria is a genus of parasitic flies in the family Tachinidae.

Species
Eutelothyria itaquaquecetubae Townsend, 1931
Eutelothyria trinitatis Thompson, 1963

References

Diptera of North America
Diptera of South America
Dexiinae
Tachinidae genera
Taxa named by Charles Henry Tyler Townsend